The Ipswich Historical Society (IHS) in Ipswich, Massachusetts was founded by Reverend Thomas Franklin Waters in 1890. The Society initially had no headquarters, and met in the studio of artist Arthur Wesley Dow. They eventually found a better place to meet in the Odd Fellows Hall.  The Society's first major project would be to restore the John Whipple House, and make part of it their headquarters.

The Heard house
The Heard house (1795-1800) was sold to the IHS in 1936 by Alice Leeds Heard, also known as Elsie. It was the family residence of American entrepreneur, Augustine Heard. She sold the house under the agreement that she could live in it for the rest of her life.  Upon her death in 1953 a plaque was installed in the house to commemorate her. The Heard house now features many collections, such as the China Trade Collection, the Arthur Wesley Dow Collection, and the Ipswich Painters Collection.

Sources
http://www.ipswichmuseum.org/
The Docent Training Manual (Created by the Ipswich Historic Society)
Ipswich in the Mass. Bay Colony by Rev. Thomas Franklin Waters

Historical societies in Massachusetts
Ipswich, Massachusetts